Marcelo Melo and Tommy Robredo were the defending champions, but decided not to participate this year.
Mariusz Fyrstenberg and Daniel Nestor won the title, defeating Juan Sebastián Cabal and Robert Farah in the final, 6–7(4–7), 6–4, [10–7].

Seeds

Draw

Draw

References
Main Draw

Men's Doubles
Brisbane International - Men's Doubles